Elana Dykewomon (October 11, 1949 – August 7, 2022) was an American lesbian activist, author, editor, and teacher. She was a recipient of the Lambda Literary Award for Lesbian Fiction.

Early life and education
Dykewomon was born Elana Michelle Nachman in Manhattan to middle class Jewish parents; her mother was a researcher and librarian, and her father was a lawyer. She and her family moved to Puerto Rico when she was eight. She studied fine art at Reed College in Portland, Oregon, earned a Bachelor of Fine Arts in creative writing from the California Institute of Arts, and her Master of Fine Arts from San Francisco State University.

Books 

In 1974, Dykewomon published her first novel, Riverfinger Women, under her name of birth, Elana Nachman.

Her second book, They Will Know Me By My Teeth, released in 1976, was published under the name Elana Dykewoman, "at once an expression of her strong commitment to the lesbian community and a way to keep herself 'honest,' since anyone reading the book would know the author was a lesbian."

Fragments From Lesbos, printed in 1981 "for lesbians only," was published under the author's current last name, "Dykewomon," in order "to avoid etymological connection with men."

In the 1989 anthology of writing by Jewish women, The Tribe of Dina, Dykewomon describes herself as "a Lesbian Separatist, descendant of the Baal Shem Tov, typesetter, ...poet"

Periodicals 
From 1987–1995, Dykewomon edited Sinister Wisdom, an international lesbian feminist journal of literature, art and politics, as well as contributing regularly to several other lesbian periodicals, including Common Lives/Lesbian Lives. She was also a regular contributor to Bridges, a magazine of writing by Jewish women.

Awards and achievements 
In 1997, Beyond the Pale won the Lambda Literary Award for Lesbian Fiction and the Ferro-Grumley Award for lesbian fiction.

In 2004, Riverfinger Women was selected as #87 in The Publishing Triangle's list of 100 Best Lesbian and Gay Novels, by a panel of judges that included Dorothy Allison, Samuel R. Delany, Lillian Faderman, M.E. Kerr, Sarah Schulman, and Barbara Smith.  In 2018, the Golden Crown Literary Society awarded Riverfinger Women with the Lee Lynch Classic Award because it is an "essential part of American literary history, LGBT literature, politics, and popular culture."

Dykewomon was awarded the Jim Duggins Outstanding Mid-Career Novelists' Prize by the Saints and Sinners Literary Festival in 2009.

Personal life and death
Dykewomon lived in Oakland, California, and taught at her alma mater San Francisco State. She was married to Susan Levinkind until her death from Lewy body dementia in 2016.

Dykewomon died of esophageal cancer at her home on August 7, 2022, aged 72, shortly before she was to view a live-streamed reading of How to Let Your Partner Die, a play she had written about Levenkind's illness and death.

Works

Books

Novels

Poetry and short story collections

Other writings 
Prose

Poetry
"I had a dream..." and "Even My Eyes Became Mouths" in 

"The Census Taker Interviews the 20th Century" and "The Vilde Chaya and Civilization" in — (1992). Bridges: A Journal for Jewish Feminists and Our Friends. Seattle, WA. 3 (1). 
"New England Cemetery" and "diving, i kiss" in 

Various in 

Foreword, "Yahrzeit," "Butch Breasts at Fifty," and "Should I Tell My Gynecologist" in

Essays

References

External links 
 Official website

1949 births
2022 deaths
20th-century American novelists
20th-century American poets
20th-century American women writers
21st-century American essayists
21st-century American novelists
21st-century American poets
21st-century American women writers
American LGBT novelists
American LGBT poets
American feminist writers
American lesbian writers
American people of Polish-Jewish descent
American people of Ukrainian-Jewish descent
American women essayists
American women novelists
American women poets
California Institute of the Arts alumni
Deaths from cancer in California
Deaths from esophageal cancer
Descendants of the Baal Shem Tov
Feminist studies scholars
Jewish American novelists
Jewish feminists
LGBT Jews
Lambda Literary Award for Lesbian Fiction winners
Lesbian feminists
Lesbian separatists
Novelists from California
Novelists from New York (state)
Poets from California
Poets from New York (state)
Radical feminists
Reed College alumni
San Francisco State University alumni
San Francisco State University faculty
Writers from Manhattan
Writers from Oakland, California